Shalom Shabazi (1619 – c. 1720) was the son of Yosef ben Avigad, of the family of Mashtā, also commonly known as Abba Sholem Shabazi or Saalem al-Shabazi. He was a Jewish poet who lived in 17th century Yemen, often referred to as the arch-poet of Yemen.

Life and works 
Shabazi was born in 1619 in the town of Najd al-Walid. His family's pedigree has been traced back to Zeraḥ, the son of Judah, the son of Jacob who is called Israel. At the death of his father, Yosef Mashta, Shalom moved to the small town of Shabaz, near the city of Ta'izz.

Not long thereafter, he again moved and settled in Ta'izz where he built a house of prayer and a ritual bath (mikveh) outside of the city, beneath Jebel Ṣabir. It was from here that he and his family were expelled, along with most of the Yemenite Jews in 1679. Shabazi, like many Jews of his generation, was influenced by Shabbetai Zevi and thought that he may be Israel's Messiah. He died in ca. 1720 and was buried in Ta'izz, beneath the mount Jebel Sabir. In the early 20th-century the grave of Shabazi was a place of pilgrimage for, both, Jews and Arabs, especially for those who sought healing. 

His father, Yosef ben Abijad ben Khalfun, was also a Rabbi and a poet. Shabazi's extant poetic diwan, comprising some 550 poems, was published for the first time by the Ben-Zvi Institute in 1977. He wrote in Hebrew, Aramaic, and Judeo-Arabic. Shabazi's other works include a treatise on astrology, a kabbalistic commentary on the Torah and a work entitled Sefer ha-Margalith. He is sometimes called the "Shakespeare of Yemen".

He wrote a commentary on the Torah called Hemdath Yamim (Pleasant Days). His leadership was instrumental in helping the Jews of Yemen survive some of the worst persecution in its history. Mori (Yemenites often call their spiritual leaders "Mori" meaning "my master" or "my teacher"). Shabazi wrote a kinah (lamentation) for recitation during the Ninth of Av, recalling the terrible exile of Jews in his lifetime (known as the Exile of Mawza) from all cities and towns in Yemen to an inhospitable desert called Mawza, duringtime the Jews were banished there of which 20% perished.

The Diwan of Mori Shabazi alludes not only to that dreadful event in 1679 but also to the Decree of the Headgear in 1667. Shabazi's Diwan has become an essential part of Yemenite Jewry's spiritual and cultural lives.

Currently, the Israeli government and the Chief Rabbinate are trying to bring the remains of Rabbi Shabazi to Israel. Many of his poems have elaborate detailed premonitions of returning to Israel, with his people.

In popular culture

Shabazi's poem "Im Nin'alu" (אם ננעלו) became a hit single sung by Israeli singer Ofra Haza whose family is of Yemenite origin, and it has also been interpreted by Yemenite singer Daklon. Other songs, such as "As'alak" (أسألك), were also performed by Ofra Haza as well as Zion Golan, Aharon Amram and Shoshana Damari.

Another famous poem, "Ahavat Ra'aya Retzoni", was performed by Zohar Argov. The Israeli metal band, Orphaned Land, sang one of his poems  "Olat Ha'tamid".

Today, in Israel, there are streets named after him in the Nachlaot neighborhood of Jerusalem and Neve Tzedek neighborhood of Tel Aviv.

Poetry 
No other Yemenite Jewish poet has had the popularity and acclaim as Shalom Shabazi who wrote hundreds of poems during his lifetime, a significant amount of which songs being preserved in a song repertoire known as the Dīwān. All songs were composed in either Hebrew or Judeo-Arabic, while many songs were a combination of both languages. The style of Shabazi's Arabic poetry is similar to the contemporary Yemeni Arabic poetry of his own day.

According to Professor emeritus, Yosef Tobi, "the fundamental revolutionary change in the poetry of Yemen occurred with the work of Yosef ben Yisrael (17th century), when poetry became the primary tool for spiritual expression of Yemenite Jewry, and when the subject of exile and redemption took on vitality and had the most concrete political significance. Even more so, we find this change in the poetry of his younger relative, Shalom Shabazī."

In Shabazi's Diwan there can be found many long eschatological poems, numbered at several dozen, and which open with the words, Baraq burayq, or with compounds that are similar to them, said to be a sign of some supernatural occurrence, as one of the signs heralding the coming of the Messiah. The founder of these genres of poetic visions of redemption is Yosef ben Yisrael in whose footsteps followed many poets, including Shabazī who is said to have refined it. An example of Shabazi's sublime poetic style is seen in the following lyric although the rhyme has been lost in the translation:

Mori Shalom Shabazi is said to have written nearly 15,000 liturgical poems on nearly all topics in Judaism, of which only about 850 have survived the ravages of persecution, time and the lack of printing presses in Yemen. He wrote his Diwan (Anthology of liturgical poetry) in Judeo-Arabic, Hebrew and Aramaic. When rumors reached Yemen concerning Shabbetai Zevi in 1666, many of the Jews of Yemen were drawn after him, including Shabazī himself, even though the rabbinic court at Ṣanʻā’ had completely rejected the faith in this pseudo-Messiah. In Shabazi's poem, Adon ha-kol meḥayye kol neshama, he alludes to Shabbetai Zevi in these words: "We have heard singing from the end of the earth: / A righteous gazelle has appeared in the East and West." The “righteous gazelle” (in original Hebrew: zevi ṣaddīq) is an allusion to Shabbetai Zevi. Mori Shalom Shabazi is also said to have composed several poems concerning the Exile of Mawza (Galut Mawza), which he witnessed in his day.

Songs of Shabazi -- A collection of abstracts

References

External links 
 Shabbazi's biography in Hebrew 
 Shabbazi's piyyut "Adon hakol"

1619 births
1720 deaths
17th-century Yemenite rabbis
18th-century Yemenite rabbis
17th-century poets
18th-century poets
Jewish poets
Judeo-Arabic writers
Hebrew-language poets
Yemeni poets